Cerithiella superba is a species of very small sea snail, a marine gastropod mollusk in the family Newtoniellidae. This species is known from European waters. It was described by Thiele, 1912.

References

Newtoniellidae
Gastropods described in 1912